The Rubicon River is a major tributary of the Middle Fork American River in the Sierra Nevada of Northern California, west of Lake Tahoe. The river's headwaters are in the Crystal Range of the Sierra Nevada, within the Eldorado National Forest's Desolation Wilderness. Historically, the Rubicon River was known as the South Fork of the Middle Fork of the American River.

Headwaters
The Rubicon River originates at  near Clyde Lake in El Dorado County. It flows north-northwest for approximately  until it reaches Rubicon Reservoir. The river then travels northwest and within  of the Rubicon Reservoir is met by Highland Creek, Miller Creek, and the Little Rubicon River. Shortly after the river begins flowing southwest from the reservoir, it serves as a border between El Dorado and Placer Counties, and joins the South Fork of the Rubicon River.

South Fork
The South Fork of the Rubicon River originates about a mile southeast of Loon Lake. It flows southwest for several miles until it is joined by Gerle Creek, and then travels west to its confluence with the Rubicon River. The Middle Fork meets the North Fork of the American River in the Auburn State Recreation Area below the Foresthill Bridge, and flows into Folsom Lake.

The reservoirs and trails along the Rubicon River are recreation areas, managed primarily by the Eldorado National Forest.

References
http://www.fs.fed.us/r5/eldorado
Sacramento Municipal Utility District (PDF)
Columbia Gazetteer of North America
California Association of Resource Conservation Districts

American River (California)
Rivers of El Dorado County, California
Rivers of the Sierra Nevada (United States)
Eldorado National Forest
Rivers of Northern California
Rivers of the Sierra Nevada in California